Adesmus basalis is a species of beetle in the family Cerambycidae. It was described by Ernst Fuchs in 1970. It is known from Ecuador.

References

Adesmus
Beetles described in 1970